Tidyman may refer to:

 Tidyman's, defunct American grocery store chain
 Bob Tidyman (1891–1916), Australian rugby league 
 Ernest Tidyman (1928–1984), American author and screenwriter
 Philip Tidyman (1776–1850), American physician, traveller and philanthropist
 the nickname for a pictogram introduced by UK-based charity Keep Britain Tidy